Nishat Afza (1935-2016) was a Pakistani politician who had been a Member of the Provincial Assembly of the Punjab from 2002 to 2007.

Early life and education
She was born on 25 August 1935.

She graduated from University of the Punjab, where she received a degree of Bachelor of Arts. She obtained a degree of Master of Arts from Government College Lahore.

Political career
She was elected to the Provincial Assembly of the Punjab as a candidate for Pakistan Peoples Party on a reserved seat for women in the 2002 Pakistani general election.

References

1935 births
2016 deaths
Punjab MPAs 2002–2007
21st-century Pakistani women politicians
University of the Punjab alumni
Government College University, Lahore alumni